In mathematics, rings are algebraic structures that generalize fields: multiplication need not be commutative and multiplicative inverses need not exist. In other words, a ring is a set equipped with two binary operations satisfying properties analogous to those of addition and multiplication of integers. Ring elements may be numbers such as integers or complex numbers, but they may also be non-numerical objects such as polynomials, square matrices, functions, and power series.

Formally, a ring is an abelian group whose operation is called addition, with a second binary operation called multiplication that is associative, is distributive over the addition operation, and has a multiplicative identity element. (Some authors use the term "" with a missing "i" to refer to the more general structure that omits this last requirement; see .)

Whether a ring is commutative (that is, whether the order in which two elements are multiplied might change the result) has profound implications on its behavior. Commutative algebra, the theory of commutative rings, is a major branch of ring theory. Its development has been greatly influenced by problems and ideas of algebraic number theory and algebraic geometry. The simplest commutative rings are those that admit division by non-zero elements; such rings are called fields.

Examples of commutative rings include the set of integers with their standard addition and multiplication, the set of polynomials with their addition and multiplication, the coordinate ring of an affine algebraic variety, and the ring of integers of a number field.

The conceptualization of rings spanned the 1870s to the 1920s, with key contributions by Dedekind, Hilbert, Fraenkel, and Noether. Rings were first formalized as a generalization of Dedekind domains that occur in number theory, and of polynomial rings and rings of invariants that occur in algebraic geometry and invariant theory. They later proved useful in other branches of mathematics such as geometry and analysis.

Definition 
A ring is a set  equipped with two binary operations + (addition) and ⋅ (multiplication) satisfying the following three sets of axioms, called the ring axioms

  is an abelian group under addition, meaning that:
 For each  in  there exists  in  such that  (that is,  is the additive inverse of ).
  is a monoid under multiplication, meaning that:
 Multiplication is distributive with respect to addition, meaning that:

Notes on the definition 
In the terminology of this article, a ring is defined to have a multiplicative identity, while a structure with the same axiomatic definition but without the requirement for a multiplicative identity is instead called a rng. For example, the set of even integers with the usual + and ⋅ is a rng, but not a ring.

The multiplication symbol  is usually omitted; for example,  means .

Although ring addition is commutative, ring multiplication is not required to be commutative:  need not necessarily equal . Rings that also satisfy commutativity for multiplication (such as the ring of integers) are called commutative rings. Books on commutative algebra or algebraic geometry often adopt the convention that ring means commutative ring, to simplify terminology.

In a ring, multiplicative inverses are not required to exist. A nonzero commutative ring in which every nonzero element has a multiplicative inverse is called a field.

The additive group of a ring is the underlying set equipped with only the operation of addition. Although the definition requires that the additive group be abelian, this can be inferred from the other ring axioms. The proof makes use of the "", and does not work in a rng. (For a rng, omitting the axiom of commutativity of addition leaves it inferable from the remaining rng assumptions only for elements that are products: .)

Although most modern authors use the term "ring" as defined here, there are a few who use the term to refer to more general structures in which there is no requirement for multiplication to be associative. For these authors, every algebra is a "ring".

Illustration

The most familiar example of a ring is the set of all integers  consisting of the numbers

 

The axioms of a ring were elaborated as a generalization of familiar properties of addition and multiplication of integers.

Some properties 
Some basic properties of a ring follow immediately from the axioms:
 The additive identity is unique.
 The additive inverse of each element is unique.
 The multiplicative identity is unique.
 If  in a ring  (or more generally,  is a unit element), then  has only one element, and is called the zero ring.
 If a ring  contains the zero ring as a subring, then  itself is the zero ring.
 The binomial formula holds for any  and  satisfying .

Example: Integers modulo 4 

Equip the set  with the following operations:

For example,  and 
For example,  and 

Example: 2-by-2 matrices 
The set of 2-by-2 square matrices with entries in a field  is

With the operations of matrix addition and matrix multiplication,  satisfies the above ring axioms. The element  is the multiplicative identity of the ring. If  and  then  while  this example shows that the ring is noncommutative.

More generally, for any ring , commutative or not, and any nonnegative integer , the square matrices of dimension  with entries in  form a ring: see Matrix ring.

History

Dedekind 
The study of rings originated from the theory of polynomial rings and the theory of algebraic integers. In 1871, Richard Dedekind defined the concept of the ring of integers of a number field. In this context, he introduced the terms "ideal" (inspired by Ernst Kummer's notion of ideal number) and "module" and studied their properties. Dedekind did not use the term "ring" and did not define the concept of a ring in a general setting.

Hilbert 
The term "Zahlring" (number ring) was coined by David Hilbert in 1892 and published in 1897. In 19th century German, the word "Ring" could mean "association", which is still used today in English in a limited sense (for example, spy ring), so if that were the etymology then it would be similar to the way "group" entered mathematics by being a non-technical word for "collection of related things". According to Harvey Cohn, Hilbert used the term for a ring that had the property of "circling directly back" to an element of itself (in the sense of an equivalence). Specifically, in a ring of algebraic integers, all high powers of an algebraic integer can be written as an integral combination of a fixed set of lower powers, and thus the powers "cycle back". For instance, if  then:

Fraenkel and Noether 
The first axiomatic definition of a ring was given by Adolf Fraenkel in 1915, but his axioms were stricter than those in the modern definition. For instance, he required every non-zero-divisor to have a multiplicative inverse. In 1921, Emmy Noether gave a modern axiomatic definition of commutative rings (with and without 1) and developed the foundations of commutative ring theory in her paper Idealtheorie in Ringbereichen.

Multiplicative identity and the term "ring" 
Fraenkel's axioms for a "ring" included that of a multiplicative identity, whereas Noether's did not.

Most or all books on algebra up to around 1960 followed Noether's convention of not requiring a 1 for a "ring". Starting in the 1960s, it became increasingly common to see books including the existence of 1 in the definition of "ring", especially in advanced books by notable authors such as Artin, Atiyah and MacDonald, Bourbaki, Eisenbud, and Lang. There are also books published as late as 2006 that use the term without the requirement for a 1.

Gardner and Wiegandt assert that, when dealing with several objects in the category of rings (as opposed to working with a fixed ring), if one requires all rings to have a 1, then some consequences include the lack of existence of infinite direct sums of rings, and that proper direct summands of rings are not subrings. They conclude that "in many, maybe most, branches of ring theory the requirement of the existence of a unity element is not sensible, and therefore unacceptable."  Poonen makes the counterargument that the natural notion for rings is the direct product rather than the direct sum. He further argues that rings without a multiplicative identity are not totally associative (the product of any finite sequence of ring elements, including the empty sequence, is well-defined, independent of the order of operations) and writes "the natural extension of associativity demands that rings should contain an empty product, so it is natural to require rings to have a 1".

Authors who follow either convention for the use of the term "ring" may use one of the following terms to refer to objects satisfying the other convention:
 to include a requirement a multiplicative identity: "unital ring", "unitary ring", "unit ring", "ring with unity", "ring with identity", "ring with a unit", or "ring with 1".
 to omit a requirement for a multiplicative identity: "rng" or "pseudo-ring", although the latter may be confusing because it also has other meanings.

Basic examples

Commutative rings 
 The prototypical example is the ring of integers with the two operations of addition and multiplication.
 The rational, real and complex numbers are commutative rings of a type called fields.
 A unital associative algebra over a commutative ring  is itself a ring as well as an -module. Some examples:
 The set of all continuous real-valued functions defined on the real line forms a commutative -algebra. The operations are pointwise addition and multiplication of functions.
 Let  be a set, and let  be a ring.

 The ring of profinite integers  the (infinite) product of the rings of -adic integers  over all prime numbers .
 The Hecke ring, the ring generated by Hecke operators.
 If  is a set, then the power set of  becomes a ring if we define addition to be the symmetric difference of sets and multiplication to be intersection. This is an example of a Boolean ring.

Noncommutative rings 
For , this matrix ring is isomorphic to  itself. For  (and  not the zero ring), this matrix ring is noncommutative.
 If G is an abelian group, then the endomorphisms of G form a ring, the endomorphism ring  of G. The operations in this ring are addition and composition of endomorphisms.
The endomorphism ring of an elliptic curve. It is a commutative ring if the elliptic curve is defined over a field of characteristic zero.
 The ring of differential operators (depending on the context). In fact, many rings that appear in analysis are noncommutative. For example, most Banach algebras are noncommutative.

Non-rings 
 The set of natural numbers  with the usual operations is not a ring, since  is not even a group (not all the elements are invertible with respect to addition – for instance, there is no natural number which can be added to 3 to get 0 as a result). There is a natural way to enlarge it to a ring, by including negative numbers to produce the ring of integers  The natural numbers (including 0) form an algebraic structure known as a semiring (which has all of the axioms of a ring excluding that of an additive inverse).
 Let  be the set of all continuous functions on the real line that vanish outside a bounded interval that depends on the function, with addition as usual but with multiplication defined as convolution:  Then  is a rng, but not a ring: the Dirac delta function has the property of a multiplicative identity, but it is not a function and hence is not an element of .

Basic concepts

Products and powers

Then  for all .

Elements in a ring 
A left zero divisor of a ring  is an element  in the ring such that there exists a nonzero element  of  such that . A right zero divisor is defined similarly.

One example of a nilpotent element is a nilpotent matrix. A nilpotent element in a nonzero ring is necessarily a zero divisor.

An idempotent  is an element such that . One example of an idempotent element is a projection in linear algebra.

For example, if  is the ring of all square matrices of size  over a field, then  consists of the set of all invertible matrices of size , and is called the general linear group.

Subring 

 the addition and multiplication of  restrict to give operations  making  a ring with the same multiplicative identity as .
  can be equipped with operations making it a ring such that the inclusion map  is a ring homomorphism.

For example, the ring  of integers is a subring of the field of real numbers and also a subring of the ring of polynomials  (in both cases,  contains 1, which is the multiplicative identity of the larger rings). On the other hand, the subset of even integers  does not contain the identity element  and thus does not qualify as a subring of  one could call  a subrng, however.

An intersection of subrings is a subring.

It is possible that  ( times) can be zero. If  is the smallest positive integer such that this occurs, then  is called the characteristic of . In some rings,  is never zero for any positive integer , and those rings are said to have characteristic zero.

Given a ring , let  denote the set of all elements  in  such that  commutes with every element in :  for any  in . Then  is a subring of , called the center of . More generally, given a subset  of , let  be the set of all elements in  that commute with every element in . Then  is a subring of , called the centralizer (or commutant) of . The center is the centralizer of the entire ring . Elements or subsets of the center are said to be central in ; they (each individually) generate a subring of the center.

Ideal 

Let  be a ring.
 
then  is a left ideal if  Similarly, a right ideal is a subset  such that  A subset  is said to be a two-sided ideal or simply ideal if it is both a left ideal and right ideal.

For example, the set of all positive and negative multiples of  along with  form an ideal of the integers, and this ideal is generated by the integer . In fact, every ideal of the ring of integers is principal.

Like a group, a ring is said to be simple if it is nonzero and it has no proper nonzero two-sided ideals. A commutative simple ring is precisely a field.

Rings are often studied with special conditions set upon their ideals. For example, a ring in which there is no strictly increasing infinite chain of left ideals is called a left Noetherian ring. A ring in which there is no strictly decreasing infinite chain of left ideals is called a left Artinian ring. It is a somewhat surprising fact that a left Artinian ring is left Noetherian (the Hopkins–Levitzki theorem). The integers, however, form a Noetherian ring which is not Artinian.

For commutative rings, the ideals generalize the classical notion of divisibility and decomposition of an integer into prime numbers in algebra.

Homomorphism 

If one is working with rngs, then the third condition is dropped.

Any bijective ring homomorphism is a ring isomorphism. Two rings  are said to be isomorphic if there is an isomorphism between them and in that case one writes  A ring homomorphism between the same ring is called an endomorphism, and an isomorphism between the same ring an automorphism.

Examples:
 The function that maps each integer  to its remainder modulo 4 (a number in ) is a homomorphism from the ring  to the quotient ring  ("quotient ring" is defined below).
 Let  be a commutative ring of prime characteristic . Then  is a ring endomorphism of  called the Frobenius homomorphism.
 For any ring , there are a unique ring homomorphism  and a unique ring homomorphism .
 An epimorphism (that is, right-cancelable morphism) of rings need not be surjective. For example, the unique map  is an epimorphism.

The kernel is a two-sided ideal of . The image of , on the other hand, is not always an ideal, but it is always a subring of .

Quotient ring 

The notion of quotient ring is analogous to the notion of a quotient group.

 

The ring  is also called a factor ring.

As with a quotient group, there is a canonical homomorphism , given by  It is surjective and satisfies the following universal property: 
 If  is a ring homomorphism such that , then there is a unique homomorphism  such that  

Module 

The concept of a module over a ring generalizes the concept of a vector space (over a field) by generalizing from multiplication of vectors with elements of a field (scalar multiplication) to multiplication with elements of a ring. This operation is commonly denoted by juxtaposition and called multiplication.
 is an abelian group under addition.

This is not only a change of notation, as the last axiom of right modules (that is ) becomes , if left multiplication (by ring elements) is used for a right module.

Basic examples of modules are ideals, including the ring itself.

Although similarly defined, the theory of modules is much more complicated than that of vector space, mainly, because, unlike vector spaces, modules are not characterized (up to an isomorphism) by a single invariant (the dimension of a vector space). In particular, not all modules have a basis.

The axioms of modules imply that , where the first minus denotes the additive inverse in the ring and the second minus the additive inverse in the module. Using this and denoting repeated addition by a multiplication by a positive integer allows identifying abelian groups with modules over the ring of integers.

In particular, every ring is an algebra over the integers.

Constructions

Direct product 

Let  and  be rings. Then the product  can be equipped with the following natural ring structure:
 
The same construction also works for an arbitrary family of rings: if  are rings indexed by a set , then  is a ring with componentwise addition and multiplication.

Let  be a commutative ring and  be ideals such that  whenever . Then the Chinese remainder theorem says there is a canonical ring isomorphism:

A "finite" direct product may also be viewed as a direct sum of ideals. Namely, let  be rings,  the inclusions with the images  (in particular  are rings though not subrings).

as a direct sum of abelian groups (because for abelian groups finite products are the same as direct sums). Clearly the direct sum of such ideals also defines a product of rings that is isomorphic to . Equivalently, the above can be done through central idempotents. Assume that  has the above decomposition. Then we can write

Again, one can reverse the construction. Namely, if one is given a partition of 1 in orthogonal central idempotents, then let  which are two-sided ideals. If each  is not a sum of orthogonal central idempotents, then their direct sum is isomorphic to .

An important application of an infinite direct product is the construction of a projective limit of rings (see below). Another application is a restricted product of a family of rings (cf. adele ring).

Polynomial ring 

Given a symbol  (called a variable) and a commutative ring , the set of polynomials
 
forms a commutative ring with the usual addition and multiplication, containing  as a subring. It is called the polynomial ring over . More generally, the set  of all polynomials in variables  forms a commutative ring, containing  as subrings.

If  is an integral domain, then  is also an integral domain; its field of fractions is the field of rational functions. If  is a Noetherian ring, then  is a Noetherian ring. If  is a unique factorization domain, then  is a unique factorization domain. Finally,  is a field if and only if  is a principal ideal domain.

Let  be commutative rings. Given an element  of , one can consider the ring homomorphism
 

(that is, the substitution).

Example:  denotes the image of the homomorphism

Example: let  be a polynomial in one variable, that is, an element in a polynomial ring .

The substitution is a special case of the universal property of a polynomial ring. For example, choosing a basis, a symmetric algebra satisfies the universal property and so is a polynomial ring.

Let  be the identity function. Each  in  defines a constant function, giving rise to the homomorphism . The universal property says that this map extends uniquely to

The resulting map is injective if and only if  is infinite.

Let  be an algebraically closed field. In particular, many local problems in algebraic geometry may be attacked through the study of the generators of an ideal in a polynomial ring. (cf. Gröbner basis.)

There are some other related constructions. A formal power series ring  consists of formal power series
 

together with multiplication and addition that mimic those for convergent series. It contains  as a subring. A formal power series ring does not have the universal property of a polynomial ring; a series may not converge after a substitution. The important advantage of a formal power series ring over a polynomial ring is that it is local (in fact, complete).

Matrix ring and endomorphism ring 

Let  be a ring (not necessarily commutative). The set of all square matrices of size  with entries in  forms a ring with the entry-wise addition and the usual matrix multiplication.

Any ring homomorphism  induces .

Schur's lemma says that if  is a simple right -module, then  is a division ring. If  is a direct sum of -copies of simple -modules  then

The Artin–Wedderburn theorem states any semisimple ring (cf. below) is of this form.

Limits and colimits of rings 

Examples of colimits:
 A polynomial ring in infinitely many variables: 
 The algebraic closure of finite fields of the same characteristic 
 The field of formal Laurent series over a field :  (it is the field of fractions of the formal power series ring )
 The function field of an algebraic variety over a field  is  where the limit runs over all the coordinate rings  of nonempty open subsets  (more succinctly it is the stalk of the structure sheaf at the generic point.)

Any commutative ring is the colimit of finitely generated subrings.

A projective limit (or a filtered limit) of rings is defined as follows. Then  is the subring of  consisting of  such that  maps to  under , .

For an example of a projective limit, see .

Localization 
The localization generalizes the construction of the field of fractions of an integral domain to an arbitrary ring and modules.

The localization is frequently applied to a commutative ring  with respect to the complement of a prime ideal (or a union of prime ideals) in .

The most important properties of localization are the following: when  is a commutative ring and  a multiplicatively closed subset
 The localization is exact:  is exact over  whenever  is exact over .
 Conversely, if  is exact for any maximal ideal  then  is exact.
 A remark: localization is no help in proving a global existence. One instance of this is that if two modules are isomorphic at all prime ideals, it does not follow that they are isomorphic. (One way to explain this is that the localization allows one to view a module as a sheaf over prime ideals and a sheaf is inherently a local notion.)

In category theory, a localization of a category amounts to making some morphisms isomorphisms. An element in a commutative ring  may be thought of as an endomorphism of any -module.

Completion 
Let  be a commutative ring, and let  be an ideal of .
The construction is especially useful when  is a maximal ideal.

A complete ring has much simpler structure than a commutative ring. This owns to the Cohen structure theorem, which says, roughly, that a complete local ring tends to look like a formal power series ring or a quotient of it. On the other hand, the interaction between the integral closure and completion has been among the most important aspects that distinguish modern commutative ring theory from the classical one developed by the likes of Noether. Pathological examples found by Nagata led to the reexamination of the roles of Noetherian rings and motivated, among other things, the definition of excellent ring.

Rings with generators and relations 
The most general way to construct a ring is by specifying generators and relations. A free ring satisfies the universal property: any function from the set  to a ring  factors through  so that  is the unique ring homomorphism. Just as in the group case, every ring can be represented as a quotient of a free ring.

In the category-theoretic terms, the formation  is the left adjoint functor of the forgetful functor from the category of rings to Set (and it is often called the free ring functor.)

Let  be algebras over a commutative ring . Then the tensor product of -modules  is an -algebra with multiplication characterized by

Special kinds of rings

Domains 
A nonzero ring with no nonzero zero-divisors is called a domain. A commutative domain is called an integral domain. The most important integral domains are principal ideal domains, PIDs for short, and fields. A principal ideal domain is an integral domain in which every ideal is principal. An important class of integral domains that contain a PID is a unique factorization domain (UFD), an integral domain in which every nonunit element is a product of prime elements (an element is prime if it generates a prime ideal.) The fundamental question in algebraic number theory is on the extent to which the ring of (generalized) integers in a number field, where an "ideal" admits prime factorization, fails to be a PID.

Among theorems concerning a PID, the most important one is the structure theorem for finitely generated modules over a principal ideal domain. The theorem may be illustrated by the following application to linear algebra. Let  be a finite-dimensional vector space over a field  and  a linear map with minimal polynomial . Then, since  is a unique factorization domain,  factors into powers of distinct irreducible polynomials (that is, prime elements):

Letting  we make  a -module.

In algebraic geometry, UFDs arise because of smoothness. More precisely, a point in a variety (over a perfect field) is smooth if the local ring at the point is a regular local ring. A regular local ring is a UFD.

The following is a chain of class inclusions that describes the relationship between rings, domains and fields:

Division ring 
A division ring is a ring such that every non-zero element is a unit. A commutative division ring is a field. A prominent example of a division ring that is not a field is the ring of quaternions. Any centralizer in a division ring is also a division ring. In particular, the center of a division ring is a field. It turned out that every finite domain (in particular finite division ring) is a field; in particular commutative (the Wedderburn's little theorem).

Every module over a division ring is a free module (has a basis); consequently, much of linear algebra can be carried out over a division ring instead of a field.

The study of conjugacy classes figures prominently in the classical theory of division rings; see, for example, the Cartan–Brauer–Hua theorem.

A cyclic algebra, introduced by L. E. Dickson, is a generalization of a quaternion algebra.

Semisimple rings 

A semisimple module is a direct sum of simple modules.  A semisimple ring is a ring that is semisimple as a left module (or right module) over itself.

Examples
 A division ring is semisimple (and simple).
 For any division ring  and positive integer , the matrix ring  is semisimple (and simple).
 Clifford algebras are semisimple.

The Weyl algebra over a field is a simple ring, but it is not semisimple.  The same holds for a ring of differential operators in many variables.

Properties
Any module over a semisimple ring is semisimple. (Proof: A free module over a semisimple ring is semisimple and any module is a quotient of a free module.)

For a ring , the following are equivalent:
  is semisimple.
  is artinian and semiprimitive.
  is a finite direct product  where each  is a positive integer, and each  is a division ring (Artin–Wedderburn theorem).

Semisimplicity is closely related to separability. A unital associative algebra  over a field  is said to be separable if the base extension  is semisimple for every field extension . If  happens to be a field, then this is equivalent to the usual definition in field theory (cf. separable extension.)

Central simple algebra and Brauer group 

Since the center of a simple -algebra is a field, any simple -algebra is a central simple algebra over its center. In this section, a central simple algebra is assumed to have finite dimension. Also, we mostly fix the base field; thus, an algebra refers to a -algebra.

The Skolem–Noether theorem states any automorphism of a central simple algebra is inner.

By the Artin–Wedderburn theorem, a central simple algebra is the matrix ring of a division ring; thus, each similarity class is represented by a unique division ring.

For example,  is trivial if  is a finite field or an algebraically closed field (more generally quasi-algebraically closed field; cf. Tsen's theorem).  has order 2 (a special case of the theorem of Frobenius). Finally, if  is a nonarchimedean local field (for example,  then  through the invariant map.

If the extension is finite and Galois, then  is canonically isomorphic to 

Azumaya algebras generalize the notion of central simple algebras to a commutative local ring.

Valuation ring 

Examples:
If  is the ring of integers, then we recover the previous example (by identifying  with the series whose -th coefficient is .)

Rings with extra structure 
A ring may be viewed as an abelian group (by using the addition operation), with extra structure: namely, ring multiplication. In the same way, there are other mathematical objects which may be considered as rings with extra structure. For example:
 An associative algebra is a ring that is also a vector space over a field  such that the scalar multiplication is compatible with the ring multiplication. For instance, the set of -by- matrices over the real field  has dimension  as a real vector space.
 A ring  is a topological ring if its set of elements  is given a topology which makes the addition map and the multiplication map  to be both continuous as maps between topological spaces (where  inherits the product topology or any other product in the category). For example, -by- matrices over the real numbers could be given either the Euclidean topology, or the Zariski topology, and in either case one would obtain a topological ring.
 A λ-ring is a commutative ring  together with operations  that are like -th exterior powers:

For example,  is a λ-ring with  the binomial coefficients. The notion plays a central rule in the algebraic approach to the Riemann–Roch theorem.
 A totally ordered ring is a ring with a total ordering that is compatible with ring operations.

Some examples of the ubiquity of rings 
Many different kinds of mathematical objects can be fruitfully analyzed in terms of some associated ring.

Cohomology ring of a topological space 
To any topological space  one can associate its integral cohomology ring

a graded ring. There are also homology groups  of a space, and indeed these were defined first, as a useful tool for distinguishing between certain pairs of topological spaces, like the spheres and tori, for which the methods of point-set topology are not well-suited. Cohomology groups were later defined in terms of homology groups in a way which is roughly analogous to the dual of a vector space. To know each individual integral homology group is essentially the same as knowing each individual integral cohomology group, because of the universal coefficient theorem. However, the advantage of the cohomology groups is that there is a natural product, which is analogous to the observation that one can multiply pointwise a -multilinear form and an -multilinear form to get a -multilinear form.

The ring structure in cohomology provides the foundation for characteristic classes of fiber bundles, intersection theory on manifolds and algebraic varieties, Schubert calculus and much more.

Burnside ring of a group 
To any group is associated its Burnside ring which uses a ring to describe the various ways the group can act on a finite set. The Burnside ring's additive group is the free abelian group whose basis are the transitive actions of the group and whose addition is the disjoint union of the action. Expressing an action in terms of the basis is decomposing an action into its transitive constituents. The multiplication is easily expressed in terms of the representation ring: the multiplication in the Burnside ring is formed by writing the tensor product of two permutation modules as a permutation module. The ring structure allows a formal way of subtracting one action from another. Since the Burnside ring is contained as a finite index subring of the representation ring, one can pass easily from one to the other by extending the coefficients from integers to the rational numbers.

Representation ring of a group ring 
To any group ring or Hopf algebra is associated its representation ring or "Green ring". The representation ring's additive group is the free abelian group whose basis are the indecomposable modules and whose addition corresponds to the direct sum. Expressing a module in terms of the basis is finding an indecomposable decomposition of the module. The multiplication is the tensor product. When the algebra is semisimple, the representation ring is just the character ring from character theory, which is more or less the Grothendieck group given a ring structure.

Function field of an irreducible algebraic variety 
To any irreducible algebraic variety is associated its function field. The points of an algebraic variety correspond to valuation rings contained in the function field and containing the coordinate ring. The study of algebraic geometry makes heavy use of commutative algebra to study geometric concepts in terms of ring-theoretic properties. Birational geometry studies maps between the subrings of the function field.

Face ring of a simplicial complex 
Every simplicial complex has an associated face ring, also called its Stanley–Reisner ring. This ring reflects many of the combinatorial properties of the simplicial complex, so it is of particular interest in algebraic combinatorics. In particular, the algebraic geometry of the Stanley–Reisner ring was used to characterize the numbers of faces in each dimension of simplicial polytopes.

Category-theoretic description 

Every ring can be thought of as a monoid in Ab, the category of abelian groups (thought of as a monoidal category under the tensor product of -modules). The monoid action of a ring  on an abelian group is simply an -module. Essentially, an -module is a generalization of the notion of a vector space – where rather than a vector space over a field, one has a "vector space over a ring".

Let  be an abelian group and let  be its endomorphism ring (see above).

Therefore, associated to any abelian group, is a ring. Conversely, given any ring,  is an abelian group. Let . In this sense, therefore, any ring can be viewed as the endomorphism ring of some abelian -group (by -group, it is meant a group with  being its set of operators). In essence, the most general form of a ring, is the endomorphism group of some abelian -group.

Any ring can be seen as a preadditive category with a single object. It is therefore natural to consider arbitrary preadditive categories to be generalizations of rings. And indeed, many definitions and theorems originally given for rings can be translated to this more general context. Additive functors between preadditive categories generalize the concept of ring homomorphism, and ideals in additive categories can be defined as sets of morphisms closed under addition and under composition with arbitrary morphisms.

Generalization 
Algebraists have defined structures more general than rings by weakening or dropping some of ring axioms.

Rng 
A rng is the same as a ring, except that the existence of a multiplicative identity is not assumed.

Nonassociative ring 
A nonassociative ring is an algebraic structure that satisfies all of the ring axioms except the associative property and the existence of a multiplicative identity. A notable example is a Lie algebra. There exists some structure theory for such algebras that generalizes the analogous results for Lie algebras and associative algebras.

Semiring 

Examples:
 the non-negative integers  with ordinary addition and multiplication;
 the tropical semiring.

Other ring-like objects

Ring object in a category 
Let  be a category with finite products. Equivalently, a ring object is an object  equipped with a factorization of its functor of points  through the category of rings:

Ring scheme 
In algebraic geometry, a ring scheme over a base scheme  is a ring object in the category of -schemes.

Ring spectrum 
In algebraic topology, a ring spectrum is a spectrum  together with a multiplication  and a unit map  from the sphere spectrum , such that the ring axiom diagrams commute up to homotopy. In practice, it is common to define a ring spectrum as a monoid object in a good category of spectra such as the category of symmetric spectra.

See also 

 Algebra over a commutative ring
 Categorical ring
 Category of rings
 Glossary of ring theory
 Nonassociative ring
 Ring of sets
 Semiring
 Spectrum of a ring
 Simplicial commutative ring

Special types of rings:

 Boolean ring
 Dedekind ring
 Differential ring
 Exponential ring
 Finite ring
 Lie ring
 Local ring
 Noetherian and artinian rings
 Ordered ring
 Poisson ring
 Reduced ring
 Regular ring
 Ring of periods
 SBI ring
 Valuation ring and discrete valuation ring

Notes

Citations

References

General references 

 
 
 
 
 .
 
 
 
 
 
 
 
 
 .
 
 
 
 .
 
 
 .
 .

Special references

Primary sources

Historical references 

 History of ring theory at the MacTutor Archive
 Garrett Birkhoff and Saunders Mac Lane (1996) A Survey of Modern Algebra, 5th ed. New York: Macmillan.
 Bronshtein, I. N. and Semendyayev, K. A. (2004) Handbook of Mathematics, 4th ed. New York: Springer-Verlag .
 Faith, Carl (1999) Rings and things and a fine array of twentieth century associative algebra. Mathematical Surveys and Monographs, 65. American Mathematical Society .
 Itô, K. editor (1986) "Rings." §368 in Encyclopedic Dictionary of Mathematics, 2nd ed., Vol. 2. Cambridge, MA: MIT Press.
 Israel Kleiner (1996) "The Genesis of the Abstract Ring Concept", American Mathematical Monthly 103: 417–424 
 Kleiner, I. (1998) "From numbers to rings: the early history of ring theory", Elemente der Mathematik 53: 18–35.
 B. L. van der Waerden (1985) A History of Algebra, Springer-Verlag,

Algebraic structures
Ring theory